Ukrainian Social Democratic Party (USDP; , Ukrajinśka social-demokratyčna partija) was a political party in Galicia. The party was founded in 1899 as an autonomous section of the Galician Social Democratic Party in Austrian Galicia and later became a separate party in 1907.  During the brief Western Ukrainian People's Republic (1918-1919) the party was briefly in government, before going into opposition.  After the capture of Galicia by the Second Polish Republic, the party became part of the constitutional Ukrainian resistance to Polish rule before being banned and mostly being subsumed into other socialist movements.

Section of Galician Social Democratic Party under Austria 
The Ukrainian Social Democratic Party was originally a Ukrainian section of the Polish-speaking Galician Social Democratic party by some ethnic-Ukrainian members of that part and leftist members of the Ukrainian Radical Party in Lviv. The key leaders were Mykola Hankevych (party chairman) and Semen Vityk. The party was based on the Ukrainian social democratic principles that were already in place by 1897. The first congress of the party took place in Lviv in 1903. In 1906, the party was amalgamated with its affiliate in Bukovina, the Social Democratic Party of Bukovina, under its leader, Yosyp Bezpalko.

The Ukrainian Social Democratic Party had close ties to the Ukrainian Social Democratic Labour Party in the Russian Empire. Ideologically the party had an Austro-Marxist orientation. It advocated the creation of an independent Ukrainian state. V. Levynsky, Y. Bachynsky and Vityk Hankevych were leading personalities of the party. The party was active mobilizing for the 1902 peasant strikes in Husyatyn and Terebovlia counties. Until 1907 the party remained as a section of the Polish-dominated Galician party and Hankevych headed the Lviv city committee of the Social Democratic Party of Galicia.

Separate party under Austria, ZUNR, and Poland 
In June 1907 the USDP has officially seceded from Galician Social Democratic Party at the party conference. The split allowed the USDP civil organization "Liberty" (Volya) to be more active in urban communities rather than to remain outside of cities.

In 1914 the party joined the Ukrainian General Council, and adopted a pro-Austrian position during the Great War.

Upon dissolution of the Austria-Hungary in 1918 and establishment of the Western Ukrainian People's Republic (ZUNR) the party became an independent Ukrainian party and joined the Ukrainian National Council (parliament of the ZUNR), but later left the coalition government creating the socialist opposition, the Peasants and Workers Union.

In 1921 the part switched to a pro-Soviet line advocating unification with Soviet Ukraine, while being hostile to the Polish government as well as the exiled government of Yevhen Petrushevych.  Some Volhynian USDP members were elected to the National Sejm of Poland in 1922. By the early 1920s the party became infiltrated by members of the Communist Party of Western Ukraine and at its sixth Congress in Lviv in March 1923 it changed its political platform to Communist and removed its older leaders including Mykola Hankevych.

The Polish authorities outlawed the party on January 30, 1924, as one that caused a threat to peace and order. After the ban, many USDP cadres joined the underground faction of Communist Party of Western Ukraine. Other members who did not join the communists became involved in the Workers Community as a public cultural and educational society. In 1928, the party was revived by Lev Hankevych's "Forward" group (Vperid). In 1933 it joined the Labor and Socialist International and in December 1934 joined the Ukrainian Socialist Bloc that also included the Ukrainian National Democratic Alliance and the Ukrainian Socialist Radical Party.

See also
 Social Democratic Party of Austria
 Polish Socialist Party

References

External links
Encyclopedia of Ukraine

1899 establishments in Austria-Hungary
1939 disestablishments in Poland
Defunct social democratic parties in Poland
Members of the Labour and Socialist International
Political parties disestablished in 1939
Political parties established in 1899
Political parties of the Russian Revolution
Ukrainian political parties in Austria-Hungary
Ukrainian political parties in Poland
Banned socialist parties
Left-wing nationalist parties